Bryn Evans (25 November 1899 – 10 July 1975) was an English professional rugby league footballer who played in the 1920s and 1930s.

Playing career

International honours
Evans won caps for England while at Swinton in 1930 against Other Nationalities, in 1932 against Wales (2 matches), 1933 against Australia, and won caps for Great Britain while at Swinton in 1927 against New Zealand, in 1928 against New Zealand, in 1929-30 against Australia, in 1932 against Australia (2 matches), and New Zealand (3 matches), and in 1933 against Australia (2 matches).

County Cup Final appearances
Evans played  in Swinton's 0–17 defeat by St Helens Recs in the 1923 Lancashire County Cup Final during the 1923–24 season at Central Park, Wigan on Saturday 24 November 1923, played , and scored a try in the 15–11 victory over Wigan in the 1925 Lancashire County Cup Final during the 1925–26 season at The Cliff, Broughton, Salford on Wednesday 9 December 1925 (postponed from Saturday 21 November 1925 due to fog), played  in the 5–2 victory over Wigan in the 1927 Lancashire County Cup Final during the 1927–28 season at Watersheddings, Oldham on Saturday 19 November 1927, and played , and was captain in the 8-10 defeat by Salford in the 1931 Lancashire County Cup Final during the 1931–32 season at Watersheddings, Oldham on Saturday 21 November 1931.

Personal life
Evans was the younger brother of the rugby league footballer; Jack Evans. Jack, also a Swinton international, was the landlord of the Royal Oak, 536 Bolton Road, Pendlebury from 1932 onwards. In later years, Jack's son, Stan Evans, was the landlord of the pub whilst Bryn himself helped out behind the bar. Bryn lived in North Drive, Swinton.

References

External links

1899 births
1975 deaths
England national rugby league team players
English rugby league players
Great Britain national rugby league team players
Lancashire rugby league team players
Rugby league five-eighths
Rugby league halfbacks
Rugby league players from Swinton, Greater Manchester
Swinton Lions captains
Swinton Lions players